Webster Vienna Private University is a private American university in Vienna, Austria. While affiliated to the Webster University in St. Louis, USA, it remains a distinct and separate institution.

History
 Webster University was founded in St. Louis, Missouri, USA in 1915. After being impressed by a visit to the Webster Geneva campus,  Vienna mayor Leopold Gratz invited Webster University to open a campus in Vienna as the country’s first and only American university beginning in 1981.

Originally located on the Schubertring in Vienna’s first district, the campus soon moved to Marokkanergasse, occupying a full three-story building. During this time in 1985, Webster Vienna became the first institution to offer an accredited MBA program in Austria. The university also became the first university in Austria to be run by a woman; Elisabeth Chopin served as Webster Vienna’s director from 1988 to 1999.

Due to a growing student population, in 1996, the campus relocated a second time to the 22nd district, Donaustadt. In the same year, Webster Vienna granted honorary doctorates to Kardinal König and former Austrian-Jewish Holocaust survivor, Simon Wiesenthal.  Later, in 2007, the university also granted an honorary degree to acclaimed social psychologist Philip Zimbardo (of Stanford University near Palo Alto, California).

In 2001, Webster Vienna became the first and only American university to receive the Austrian private university accreditation.

In fall 2014, Webster Vienna moved to its current, modern campus in the historic Palais Wenkheim close to the city center. The newly renovated building provides technical equipment on more than 5,000 m² (or 55,000 sq ft).
On 15 October 2015 until the end of June 2016 Bernd Marin took over the director's chair from Arthur Hirsh, who had served for 15 years. Johannes Pollak took over as new director as of July 2016.

Academic departments & programs
At Webster Vienna Private University programs in four departments are offered.

Undergraduate programs
 Business Administration (BS) 
 International Relations (BA) 
 Management (BA) | Media Communications (BA) 
 Psychology (BA) 
 Certificate Program | Global Citizenship Program
Graduate programs
 Finance (MSc) 
 International Relations (MA) 
 Marketing (MSc) 
 Master of Business Administration (MBA) 
 Psychology (MA) 
 Webster Vienna also offers certificate programs in Digital Media- Design & Production and Entrepreneurship.

All classes are held in English.

People

Students

The student body consists of over 500 students from 70 countries.  About 20% of the student population comes from the local Austrian community and 10% from the United States.

The campus has various student organizations including a Student Government Association, a Delta Mu Delta chapter, and a debate team in addition to numerous sports and academic clubs.  Students are also encouraged to establish their own student organizations if they would like to participate in a special interest group which hasn't already been organized. To facilitate these student initiatives as well as many others, The WebsterLEADS program offers guidance and resources to further develop students' leadership skills and ideas.

Faculty
The university hosts over 100 adjunct professors, research professors and teaching faculty from over 40 countries covering five continents.

Alumni

The Webster alumni network includes over 180,000 alumni worldwide and nearly 3,000 alumni graduated from the Webster Vienna campus. Notable alumni include Gernot Mittendorfer, CFO Erste Bank, Peter Harold, CEO of Hypo Noe Group and South Korean Film-Director, Juhn Jai-hong.

Global perspective

Webster worldwide
As a member of the Webster University Network, Webster Vienna students have the option of studying abroad at any of Webster's campuses located in eight countries. Webster has campuses in Austria, China, Ghana, Switzerland, Thailand, the Netherlands, the United Kingdom and the USA.

In addition to their own campuses, Webster holds partnerships with a few universities worldwide including Kansai University in Osaka, Japan and The Universidad Autónoma de Guadalajara in Guadalajara, Mexico.

As one university system, the international connections Webster has worldwide provides an easy path for their students to study abroad. Students who choose to study abroad have the security of all courses transferring, plus the benefit of choosing a flexible length of stay of between eight weeks to over a year within the same university.

Global Citizenship Program
Each student who enters the undergraduate degree program is required to complete Webster's Global Citizenship Program. The program aims at teaching students how to confront global issues and the quickly-changing society of the 21st century. The program criteria include six knowledge areas (Roots of Cultures, Social Systems & Human Behavior, Physical & Natural World, Global Understanding, Arts Appreciation, and Quantitative Literacy) and five skill areas (Critical Thinking, Oral Communication, Ethical Reasoning, Written Communication, Intercultural Competence) each with a variety of courses students can choose from.

Graduation
Every May, Bachelor and Master’s graduates complete their Webster education with a traditional American graduation ceremony, complete with the cap and gown academic dress.  Each year, the ceremony is attended by a notable guest commencement speaker, who prepares a special address to the graduates for the occasion. Webster Vienna's most recent graduation speakers have included the following: 

2005. Ambassador George Herbert Walker III (Ambassador to Hungary)

2006. Emil Brix (Austrian diplomat and historian)

2007. Philip Zimbardo (Stanford professor, known for the Stanford Prison Experiment)

2008. Thomas Hintze, CEO UPC Austria and chair of Webster Vienna advisory board

2009. Father Georg Sporschil SJ, founder, Concordia Sozialprojekte

2010. Kandeh Yumkella, director general, UNIDO

2011. Gernot Mittendorfer, CFO and board member, Erste Group Bank

2012. Felix Thun-Hohenstein, managing director, 3M Alpine Region

2013. US Ambassador to Austria H.E. William C. Eacho

2014. Tolga Yacizi, board of trustees president, Plato Education Group

2015. US Ambassador to Austria Alexa L. Wesner

2016. Hannes Androsch, leading Austrian entrepreneur and politician

Accreditations & recognitions
Webster Vienna Private University is accredited in the United States by the Higher Learning Commission at both the undergraduate and graduate levels. Since 2001, the university has also held accreditation with the Austrian Accreditation Council as an Austrian private university. Furthermore, all Business and Management programs at Webster Vienna are accredited by the Accreditation Council for Business Schools and Programs (ACBSP).

Additional recognitions given to Webster Vienna include the following:

• CFA (Chartered Financial Analyst) Institute has recognized Webster Vienna's MSc in Finance for incorporating at least 70% of the CFA Program Candidate Body of Knowledge.

• Webster Vienna is the first and only university in Austria to be recognized by the Institute of Chartered Accountants in England and Wales (ICAEW) as a Partner in Learning.

Research
The Webster Vienna research faculty regularly publishes literature within academic journals, books and conference proceedings. The topics of research emphasized at the institution are the following:

Psychology

• Psychological/behavioral decision making

• Psychological aspects of counseling and psychotherapy (e.g., psychotherapy, organizational psychology, coaching, supervision, consulting, teams, groups, and leadership)

Business & Management

• Management information systems

• Marketing

• Strategic management

• Supply chain management

International Relations

• Political representation beyond the nation-state

• Participation of national parliaments in European affairs

• European Energy Policy

• Political Violence

• Trends in Terrorism and Counter-Terrorism

External links

 Official website of Webster University Vienna

References

Vienna
Webster University
Educational institutions established in 1981
Private universities and colleges in Austria
1981 establishments in Austria